Springfield Township is one of the twelve townships of Hamilton County, Ohio, United States.  The population was 35,862 as of the 2020 census. Springfield Township is home to the largest private school in Ohio (St. Xavier High School), the largest lake in Hamilton County (at Winton Woods County Park), and the Cincinnati area's annual Greek Festival (at Holy Trinity-St. Nicholas Greek Orthodox Church).

Geography
Springfield Township is suburban with abundant green space and parks, including most of the 2,500-acre Winton Woods County Park. The township also includes the largest lake in Hamilton County, the 188 surface-acre Winton Woods lake.

Springfield Township today consists of the core of the original township boundaries, although five non-contiguous "islands" exist due to annexations.  The Township Master Plan divides the township into eleven neighborhoods, which closely align with the seven public school districts serving the township, but generally not the five census-designated places (CDPs).

The following municipalities have become independent of, or annexed land within, the original Springfield Township boundaries:

The Township borders ten municipalities, and Colerain Township to the west:
Fairfield - north, north of Forest Park
Forest Park - north, between Fairfield and Green Hills, west of Springdale
Greenhills - north, south of Forest Park
Springdale - northeast, between Forest Park and Glendale
Glendale - northeast, between Springdale and Woodlawn
Woodlawn - east, between Glendale and Wyoming
Wyoming - southeast, between Woodlawn and Cincinnati
Cincinnati - south
North College Hill - southwest, south of Mount Healthy
Mount Healthy - southwest, north of North College Hill
Colerain Township - west

Name
Springfield Township is one of 11 townships by this name statewide.

History
In 1795, upon the signing of the Treaty of Greenville, the court of general quarter sessions of the peace for Hamilton County created Springfield and Fairfield townships out of the northern reaches of Cincinnati Township.

In 1810, Millcreek Township was formed from the northern part of Cincinnati Township and the southern part of Springfield Township.

Government
The township is governed by a three-member Board of Trustees, who are elected in November of odd-numbered years to a four-year term beginning on the following January 1. Two are elected in the year after the presidential election and one is elected in the year before it, alongside an elected township Fiscal Officer, who serves a four-year term beginning on April 1 of the year after the election.. Vacancies in the Fiscal Office or on the Board of Trustees are filled by the remaining trustees.

The current Trustees are Kristie Dukes Davis, Joseph Honerlaw, and Mark Berning. Dan Berning is the Fiscal Officer.

Education
Public elementary and secondary education is provided by seven school districts:

Only Finneytown school boundaries are solely within the boundaries of Springfield Township.

Private schools within the boundaries of Springfield Township include:

St. Xavier is the largest private school in Ohio

References

External links
Township website
County website
Waycross Community Media

Townships in Hamilton County, Ohio
Townships in Ohio
1795 establishments in the Northwest Territory